Chilapa may refer to:

Chilapa de Álvarez, a city in the Mexican state of Guerrero
Chilapa, Nayarit, a city in the Mexican state of Nayarit
Santa María Chilapa de Diaz, a town in the Mexican state of Oaxaca
Chilapa River, a river in Mexico
Chilapa, a minor character in the television show Xena: Warrior Princess